Salopian Art Pottery was a range of decorative earthenwares made by the Benthall Pottery at Benthall, Shropshire, England, between c. 1880 and c. 1930. Pieces were marked with a variety of impressed and inscribed marks, the most frequent mark being 'SALOPIAN' in upper-case printers' type.

External links
 Salopian Art Pottery website
 Salopian Art Pottery images from the Shrewsbury Museum collections

Ceramics manufacturers of England
English pottery
History of Shropshire
Art pottery